Capitol Place is a high-rise office building located in Washington, D.C., United States.

See also
List of tallest buildings in Washington, D.C.

References

Skyscraper office buildings in Washington, D.C.

Office buildings completed in 1985
1985 establishments in Washington, D.C.